The New Guinean rat (Rattus novaeguineae) is a species of rodent in the family Muridae.
It is found only in parts of central Papua New Guinea.

References

Rattus
Endemic fauna of Papua New Guinea
Rodents of Papua New Guinea
Mammals described in 1982
Taxonomy articles created by Polbot
Rodents of New Guinea